The Korea Baseball Organization (KBO) is the governing body for the professional leagues of baseball in South Korea. The KBO was founded in 1981 and has governed two leagues: the KBO League and KBO Futures League ( (farm league) since 1982. It is one of two major baseball governing bodies; the other is the Korea Baseball Association, which is the governing body for amateur baseball competitions.

The KBO is a member of the International Baseball Federation (IBAF), and is responsible for the national baseball team for the World Baseball Classic and Asia Series. National team participation in other competitions is governed by the Korea Baseball Association.

Awards
See Baseball awards#South Korea

KBO League MVP Award
KBO League Rookie of the Year Award
KBO League Golden Glove Award
KBO League Korean Series MVP Award
KBO League All-Star Game MVP
Korean Series Most Valuable Player Award

See also 

 Baseball in Korea
 KBO League, the highest level professional baseball league in Korea
 List of KBO Career Hits leaders 
 KBO Futures League
 Korea Baseball Association (KBA)
 International Baseball Federation (IBAF)
 Baseball Federation of Japan
 Australian Baseball Federation
 Baseball Federation of Asia
 Baseball Confederation of Oceania
 Confederation of European Baseball
 Pan American Baseball Confederation

References

External links 
 Korea Baseball Organization (KBO) official website 
 Korea Baseball Organization (KBO) official website 
 Korea Baseball Association (KBA) official website 

 
baseball
Sports organizations established in 1981
Baseball governing bodies in Asia